The Remote Peninsula is a peninsula located on the eastern coast of Baffin Island. It is part of the Qikiqtaaluk Region of the Canadian territory of Nunavut.

Geography
The Remote Peninsula extends northwards into the Baffin Bay from the island's mainland. It is bounded by Gibbs Fiord and the Stewart Valley in the east, the Baffin Bay in the north, Sam Ford Fiord in the east, and in the south by Walker Arm, the latter fjord's offshoot. The peninsula is attached to the mainland by a narrow isthmus in the southwest.

It is mountainous and has many active glaciers. Other noteworthy mountains include the formidable-looking Sail Peaks facing Stewart Valley, and also Tiiturvik Peak, Nauttiaq Peak, Qablunaaq Peak, Aglu Peak, Mount Longstaff, Nallaqtaq Peak and Atqut Ridge —all located in the southern and SW area of the peninsula, as well as Hangover Hill in the east.

The Remote Lake is an isolated 10 m deep lake in the northeast of the peninsula where a phenomenon of unnatural warming has been detected.  Other noteworthy geographic features of the peninsula include Cape Come Again (Qaqulluit Nuvua) —its northernmost headland, and Refuge Harbour in the west.

Bibliography

References

External links
Great Sail Peak
Hangover Hill Satellite Imagery
NRC Remote Peninsula
Eco-Evo conservation of Arctic biodiversity
Into the Arctic Expedition Photos

Peninsulas of Baffin Island